The Hoo is a Grade II* listed country house in Great Gaddesden, Hertfordshire, England. It dates from around 1683. In 1944 it was in use as a maternity home.

References

Grade II* listed buildings in Hertfordshire
Buildings and structures completed in 1683
Country houses in Hertfordshire
Grade II* listed houses
Dacorum
Maternity homes